Mount Healthy is a city in Hamilton County, Ohio, United States, in the Cincinnati/Northern Kentucky metropolitan area. The population was 6,996 at the 2020 census.

History
Mount Healthy was founded in 1817 as the village of Mount Pleasant. In 1850, the village renamed itself "Mount Healthy", following a cholera epidemic, in which many of its citizens survived while those in the surrounding territory did not. The village became a city in 1951.

Geography
Mount Healthy is located at  (39.231808, -84.547244).

Demographics

2010 census
As of the census of 2010, there were 6,098 people, 2,716 households, and 1,454 families living in the city. The racial makeup of the city was 62.4% White, 33.0% African American, 0.2% Native American, 0.7% Asian, 0.1% Pacific Islander, 0.9% from other races, and 2.6% from two or more races. Hispanic or Latino of any race were 1.9% of the population.

There were 2,716 households, of which 27.7% had children under the age of 18 living with them, 31.4% were married couples living together, 17.2% had a female householder with no husband present, 4.9% had a male householder with no wife present, and 46.5% were non-families. 41.2% of all households were made up of individuals, and 17.5% had someone living alone who was 65 years of age or older. The average household size was 2.17 and the average family size was 2.97.

The median age in the city was 40 years. 22.9% of residents were under the age of 18; 8% were between the ages of 18 and 24; 25.3% were from 25 to 44; 25.8% were from 45 to 64; and 18.2% were 65 years of age or older. The gender makeup of the city was 44.9% male and 55.1% female.

2000 census
As of the census of 2000, there were 7,149 people, 3,222 households, and 1,772 families living in the city. The population density was 5,022.2 people per square mile (1,943.8/km2). There were 3,421 housing units at an average density of 2,403.2 per square mile (930.2/km2). The racial makeup of the city was 73.70% White, 23.32% African American, 0.20% Native American, 0.49% Asian, 0.06% Pacific Islander, 0.60% from other races, and 1.64% from two or more races. Hispanic or Latino of any race were 1.02% of the population.

There were 3,222 households, out of which 28.2% had children under the age of 18 living with them, 36.3% were married couples living together, 15.3% had a female householder with no husband present, and 45.0% were non-families. 40.5% of all households were made up of individuals, and 18.1% had someone living alone who was 65 years of age or older. The average household size was 2.16 and the average family size was 2.93.

In the city the population was spread out, with 24.0% under the age of 18, 8.4% from 18 to 24, 30.4% from 25 to 44, 17.9% from 45 to 64, and 19.3% who were 65 years of age or older. The median age was 37 years. For every 100 females, there were 77.1 males. For every 100 females age 18 and over, there were 71.4 males.

The median income for a household in the city was $32,982, and the median income for a family was $41,753. Males had a median income of $31,783 versus $26,926 for females. The per capita income for the city was $18,662. About 6.8% of families and 8.9% of the population were below the poverty line, including 13.4% of those under age 18 and 11.4% of those age 65 or over.

Education
There are currently three schools within the actual city limits (one square mile): Mt. Healthy South Elementary School, Mt. Healthy North Elementary School, and Mount Healthy Jr./Sr. High School, which are all part of the Mt. Healthy City School District.  There is also the Mt. Healthy Preparatory and Fitness Academy which is a charter school.

Mount Healthy is served by a branch of the Public Library of Cincinnati and Hamilton County.

Notable people
 Diyral Briggs professional football linebacker, Green Bay Packers
 Alice Cary poet
 Phoebe Cary poet
 Robert S. Duncanson first internationally known African-American artist
 William Davis Gallagher journalist and poet
 Oliver S. Glisson Navy rear admiral
 Joel Heath professional football nose tackle, Denver Broncos
 Paul Helms baking industry executive and sports philanthropist
 Jeff Hill professional football wide receiver, Cincinnati Bengals
 Nathaniel Dana Carlile Hodges librarian
 Dummy Hoy professional baseball center fielder, Cincinnati Reds
 Pee Wee Hunt jazz trombonist, vocalist, and bandleader
 William H. MacKenzie New York state assemblyman
 David Montgomery professional football running back, Chicago Bears
 Elizabeth Nourse realist painter
 Suzanne Farrell American ballerina

References

External links
 City website
 Mt. Healthy Renaissance Project, a Community Development Corporation

Cities in Ohio
Cities in Hamilton County, Ohio
Populated places established in 1817
1817 establishments in Ohio